BCK is the abbreviation of:

 Bahria College Karachi college in Karachi, Pakistan
 BC Kosher, a kosher certification agency in Canada
 BCK algebra, in mathematics, BCK or BCI algebras are algebraic structures
 British Rail coach type code representing a Brake composite corridor coach
 Buckley railway station, a railway station in the UK
 Buckie, a town in Scotland
 Compagnie du chemin de fer du bas-Congo au Katanga, former railway company in Congo
 3-Methyl-2-oxobutanoate dehydrogenase (acetyl-transferring) kinase, an enzyme